Pershing Square is a small public park in Downtown Los Angeles, California, one square block in size, bounded by 5th Street to the north, 6th Street to the south, Hill Street to the east, and Olive Street to the west. Originally dedicated in 1866 by Mayor Cristóbal Aguilar as La Plaza Abaja, the square has had numerous names over the years until it was finally dedicated in honor of General John J. Pershing in 1918.

History

19th century 

In the 1850s, the location was used as a camp by settlers from outside the Pueblo de Los Angeles, which lay to the northeast around the Our Lady Queen of the Angels' church, the Los Angeles Plaza, and present-day Olvera Street. Surveyors drew the site as 10 individual plots of land, but in practicality it was a single  parcel. Canals distributing water from the Zanja Madre were adjacent. In 1866 the site was dedicated as a public square by Mayor Cristobal Aguilar; it was called La Plaza Abaja (Spanish for "the lower plaza")." At some point the owner of a nearby beergarden, German immigrant George "Roundhouse" Lehman, planted small native Monterey cypress trees, fruit trees, and flowering shrubs in the park and maintained them until his death in 1882.

In 1867, St. Vincent's College, present-day Loyola Marymount University, was situated across the street, and so the park informally became known as St. Vincent's Park.  In 1870, it was officially named Los Angeles Park. In 1886 it was renamed 6th Street Park, and it redesigned with an "official park plan" by Frederick Eaton.  In the early 1890s it was renamed Central Park. During this period a bandstand pavilion was added for concerts and orators. The plantings became sub-tropically lush, and the park became a shady oasis and an outdoor destination. In 1894 the park was used as the staging area for the annual crowning of the queen of 'La Fiesta de Los Angeles.

Early 20th century 

A monument to California's twenty Spanish–American War dead was erected in 1900; it is said to be modeled after a Spanish–American War veteran, 7th California Infantry volunteer Charlie Hammond of San Francisco, and it is believed to be the oldest work of public art in Los Angeles. The Los Angeles City Council declared it a historic-cultural monument in 1990.

In 1910 the park was renovated under a design by John Parkinson, who later designed Los Angeles City Hall and Union Station. Parkinson's design featured a three-tier fountain sculpted by Johan Caspar Lachne Gruenfeld, braced by four life-size concrete cherubs supporting a vase of cascading water. In November 1918, a week after Armistice Day ended World War I, the park was renamed Pershing Square, in honor of Gen. John J. Pershing. A plaque was added in his honor some four decades later.

In the 1920s and 1930s tropical plants were added to the park. In 1924, a life-size bronze of a World War I doughboy, sculpted by Humberton Pedretti, was unveiled, flanked by old cannons. In 1935, a bronze cannon from the USS Constitution was added. 

In 1932, a statue of Ludwig van Beethoven was added to honor William Andrews Clark, Jr., founder of the Los Angeles Philharmonic. “His statue faces the former Philharmonic Auditorium across Fifth Street, which reverted to church use after the new Music Center opened.”

Later 20th century 
The park was in heavy use during World War II for rallies and recruitment. After the war, the park began to decline as commercial decentralization and suburbanization took hold in Greater Los Angeles Area, and Downtown lost importance and intensity of use.

Many of the palm trees that were excavated in the 1950s were sent to be used in the Disneyland ride The Jungle Cruise.

The entire park was demolished and excavated in 1952 to build a three-level underground parking garage. Atop the garage, concrete was covered by a thin layer of soil with a broad expanse of lawn. Entry and exit ramps cut the square off from the sidewalks around it. In 1954, Kelly Roth, a Hungarian immigrant who had owned a cigar store across from the square, donated $30,000 for twin reflecting pool water features in honor of his late wife and to thank Los Angeles for the opportunities that the city provided him. The Roth fountains were designed by architect Stiles O. Clements.

The park continued to be neglected for safe uses. Its problems were noted during the 1960 Democratic National Convention, with nominee and future president John F. Kennedy headquartered at the Biltmore Hotel facing the park. By the 1984 Summer Olympics the park had become a serious eyesore, leading the city to spend $1 million for a temporary renovation.

In 1992, the park was closed for a major $14.5-million redesign and renovation by Mexican architect and landscape architect Ricardo Legorreta and U.S. landscape architect Laurie Olin. The redesigned park opened in 1994 with a 10-story purple bell tower, fountains, and a walkway representing an earthquake fault line (by artist Barbara McCarren), concert stage, and perimeter seating.  Pavement covered almost the entire block, with copses of trees placed in raised planters. In 1994, the park was featured in Visiting... with Huell Howser Episode 208.

21st century 
In 2000, a monument was installed to honor local veteran Eugene A. Obregon.
Pershing Square regularly hosts seasonal events such as a temporary Ice rink in the winter and DTLA Proud Festival and live concert performances in the summer.

Public art 
Permanent and temporary public art has been placed in Pershing Square since 1900, beginning with Los Angeles' oldest public art sculpture, the Spanish American War Memorial.

 Spanish–American War Memorial (1900)
 The Doughboy (1924)
 Statue of Ludwig van Beethoven (1932)
 Neons for Pershing Square (1993) [transit station art below Pershing Square]
 Liquid Shard (temporary installation) (August, 2016)

Transit
The area is served by the Pershing Square station of the Metro B and D lines.

See also
List of parks in Los Angeles
Liquid Shard, a 2016 art installation placed in Pershing Square
DTLA Proud Festival

Further reading
Chester Himes (March 22, 2000). "Lunching at the Ritzmore", The Collected Stories of Chester Himes, Da Capo Press. (Set in Pershing Square)

References

External links 

"Pershing Square search results". Los Angeles Public Library.
Wallach, Ruth (February 2000). "Historic Pershing Square, Los Angeles". University of Southern California Libraries, Public Art in Los Angeles.
Holland, Gale (25 October 2012). "Pershing Square vision? Not so good". Los Angeles Times.
Image of statue of Ludwig van Beethoven in Pershing Square on the day of its unveiling, Los Angeles, 1932-1939. Los Angeles Times Photographic Archive (Collection 1429). UCLA Library Special Collections, Charles E. Young Research Library, University of California, Los Angeles.

1866 establishments in California
Downtown Los Angeles
History of Los Angeles
Landmarks in Los Angeles
Monuments and memorials in Los Angeles
Parks in Los Angeles
Ricardo Legorreta buildings
Squares and plazas in Los Angeles